Robin Michael Faccenda  (born 21 June 1937) is a businessman in the poultry industry.  According to the 2005 Sunday Times Rich List, he was the 654th richest man in Britain with a combined wealth of £75m.  , The Sunday Times valued his wealth at £45m.

Early life
He gained a National Diploma in Poultry from Harper Adams College in 1961.

Career
He is the chairman of the Faccenda Group, the second largest Chicken processor in the UK, and owner of its parent company Hillesden Investments Ltd.

He previously owned several other businesses, including Direct Legal & Collections, a debt collection agency.

Faccenda was appointed Officer of the Order of the British Empire (OBE) in the 2023 New Year Honours for services to the UK poultry industry and education.

Personal life
He lives in Hillesden in Aylesbury Vale, Buckinghamshire, between Bicester and Bletchley.

See also
 Bernard Matthews

References 

1937 births
Alumni of Harper Adams University
British food industry businesspeople
Living people
People from Aylesbury Vale
Officers of the Order of the British Empire